Chandrika is an Indian actress and producer of Kannada cinema. Her best known films are Kendasampige (2015), Golmaal Radhakrishna (1990)and Neenu Nakkare Haalu Sakkare (1991).

Career
Chandrika has starred in more than thirty Kannada films and also participated in the reality show Bigg Boss Kannada, Season 1.

Selected filmography 

 Golmaal Radhakrishna (1990)
 Golmaal Radhakrishna 2 (1991)
 C. B. I. Shiva (1991)
 Jana Mecchida Maga (1993)
 Vikram (1993)
 Dakshayini (1993)
 Chathurbhuja (2014) (special appearance in song)
 Kendasampige (2015)

See also

List of people from Karnataka
Cinema of Karnataka
List of Indian film actresses
Cinema of India

References

External links
 

Actresses in Kannada cinema
Living people
Kannada people
Actresses from Karnataka
Actresses from Bangalore
Indian film actresses
21st-century Indian actresses
Year of birth missing (living people)
Bigg Boss Kannada contestants